Onamunhama Combined School is a school in Onamunhama in the Ohangwena Region of northern Namibia. It was established during colonial time.

See also
 Education in Namibia
 List of schools in Namibia

References

Buildings and structures in Ohangwena Region
Educational institutions with year of establishment missing
Schools in Ohangwena Region